Wank'ayuq Saywa (Quechua wank'a rock, -yuq a suffix to indicate ownership, saywa boundary stone, landmark, "rocky landmark" or "landmark with rocks", Hispanicized spelling Huancayojsayhua, Hiancayojsayhua) is a mountain in the Wansu mountain range in the Andes of Peru, about  high. It is situated in the Apurímac Region, Antabamba Province, in the districts of Antabamba and Oropesa. Wank'ayuq Saywa lies west of Q'illu Pachaka and southeast of Hatun Qillqa.

References 

Mountains of Peru
Mountains of Apurímac Region